Toukon Festival: Wrestling World 2005 was a professional wrestling event produced by New Japan Pro-Wrestling. It took place on January 4 in the Tokyo Dome. Toukon Festival: Wrestling World 2005 was the fourteenth January 4 Tokyo Dome Show held by NJPW. Officially, the show drew 46,000 spectators. The undercard of the show featured an eight-man "submissions only" tournament which Ron Waterman won when he forced Yuji Nagata to submit in the finals. The show also saw Tiger Mask defeat Heat to win the IWGP Junior Heavyweight Championship and in the main event Shinsuke Nakamura defeated Hiroshi Tanahashi to win the IWGP U-30 Openweight Championship. The show also featured a unique "Dog Fight" match between Masahiro Chono, Riki Choshu and Hiroyoshi Tenzan. Chono defeated Chosu in the first match and as a result had to wrestle Tenzan in the next match.

Production

Background
As New Japan Pro Wrestling's January 4 Tokyo Dome event for that year, Toukon Festival: Wrestling World 2005 was a precursor to Wrestle Kingdom, which is NJPW's biggest annual event and has been called "the largest professional wrestling show in the world outside of the United States" and the "Japanese equivalent to the Super Bowl".

Storylines
Wrestling World 2005 in Tokyo Dome featured professional wrestling matches that involved different wrestlers from pre-existing scripted feuds and storylines. Wrestlers portrayed villains, heroes, or less distinguishable characters in scripted events that built tension and culminated in a wrestling match or series of matches.

Results

Submissions Only Tournament bracket

References

2005 in professional wrestling
2005 in Tokyo
Toukon Festival: Wrestling World 2005
January 2005 events in Japan